Comfort Lodge is a heritage-listed former residence and boarding house, now offices, at 62 Prospect Street, Rosehill, City of Parramatta, New South Wales, Australia. It was built in 1880. It is also known as Cransley. It was added to the New South Wales State Heritage Register on 2 April 1999.

History 

The land on which Comfort Lodge stands was auctioned as part of the first subdivision of Elizabeth Farm in February 1883, at which time it was bought by builder William Cameron. He built the house  1889, naming it "Cransley". One subsequent owner was Edwin John Brown OBE, a 29-year Parramatta alderman. It was renamed Comfort Lodge in 1982, when it was turned into a boarding house. A Permanent Conservation Order was placed over Comfort Lodge on 2 December 1983. Since 1989, it has been used as professional chambers. It was transferred to the State Heritage Register on 2 April 1999.

Description 
Comfort Lodge is a two-storey Victorian Italianate villa of stuccoed brickwork with gabled corrugated iron roof. Three sided bay front on gabled wing with stucco string courses and label moulds and elaborately fretted bargeboards. Two storey verandah to north and east sides has bullnose corrugated iron roof, timber floors and cast iron posts, balustrading and valence. Set well back from the road.

Heritage listing 
Comfort Lodge is a very good example of a mid-Victorian house in the Parramatta district. It is complemented and enhanced by the adjoining Victorian residence "Camden" which is identical in design. Only six other buildings of similar period and architectural style exist in the Parramatta region.

Comfort Lodge was listed on the New South Wales State Heritage Register on 2 April 1999 having satisfied the following criteria.

References

Bibliography

External links

Attribution 

New South Wales State Heritage Register
Houses in Sydney
Articles incorporating text from the New South Wales State Heritage Register
1880 establishments in Australia
Houses completed in 1880